was a tokusatsu science fiction/espionage/action TV series.  Created by Japanese effects wizard Eiji Tsuburaya, the show was produced by Tsuburaya Productions and was broadcast on Fuji TV from April 6, 1968 to June 29, 1968, with a total of 13 one-hour episodes. The music for the episodes was done by Isao Tomita and Kunio Miyauchi.

Reportedly, Eiji Tsuburaya considered this series his masterwork because the focus was on the people, rather than on the vehicles and special effects (the show never had any monsters or aliens, as his more famous shows Ultra Q, Ultraman and Ultra Seven did).  This focus on the people was similar to the works of Gerry Anderson, of which Tsuburaya was a big fan. The Mighty Jack mecha/HQ featured in this series also has some similarities to Tsuburaya's previous TV masterpiece, Ultra Seven.

Even for the original series of 13 one hour-long episodes, the ratings were low. The follow-up series, Fight! Mighty Jack, fared better in the ratings, perhaps because of its inclusion of monsters and aliens, rather than purely human evildoers like Q.

The insignia of the titular heroic spy team has also become the current logo for Tsuburaya Productions.

Plot
"Mighty Jack" is the name of both a top-secret international peacekeeping organization's 11 agents, and the technologically advanced flying submarine "Mighty-Gō" they use to fight the plots of the terrorist organization "Q".

Cast
 Hideaki Nitani
 Hiroshi Minami
 Naoko Kubo
 Akiyoshi Kasuga
 Wakako Ikeda
 Masanari Nihei
 Hideyo Amamoto
 Masayoshi Fukuoka
 Yoshitaka Tanaka
 Noriaka Inoue
 Mitsuru Ōya
 Gorō Mutsu
 Anne Marie
 Jirō Yanaga

Episodes 1~ 13

Staff

Fight! Mighty Jack
The more comical sequel series, aired on the same network from July 6 to December 28, 1968, with a total of 26 half-hour episodes, equaling the original in length.

This series has several humorous references to the early Ultra Series.

 The opening scene of the series (with a reverse paint-swirling effect forming "MJ" before a burst of red envelops the scene, with a yellow "Fight! Mighty Jack" superimposed) is almost exactly like that of Ultraman.
 One episode of this series is quite notable, as it features a comical guest appearance by Kohji Moritsugu, who played Dan Moroboshi, the alter-ego of Ultra Seven, poking fun at his popular role.  He plays a mechanic, who, in one scene, looked as though he was about to transform into Ultra Seven by pulling the Ultra Eye from his pocket to put it on, but the red object he slowly pulls from his pocket is actually a small wrench, with which he gets right to work on fixing a machine.

Staff

Mighty Jack in the U.S.

In 1986, American producer Sandy Frank took the first and sixth episodes of Mighty Jack (without any of the episodes that were released in between or afterward) and combined them into a dubbed feature-length film of the same name. The movie gained its widest exposure in the United States when it was shown as a Mystery Science Theater 3000 episode on Comedy Central (originally shown on the UHF station KTMA TV 23 during the show's KTMA season).

External links

Mystery Science Theater 3000 
 
 
 Episode guide: K14- Mighty Jack
 Episode guide: 314- Mighty Jack

References

1968 Japanese television series debuts
1968 Japanese television series endings
Tokusatsu television series
1968 films
Ultra television series
Tsuburaya Productions
Fuji TV original programming